Johan "Jan" van Galen (1604 – 23 March 1653) was a Commodore of the Republic of the Seven United Provinces of the Netherlands. he participated in the First Anglo-Dutch War.

Biography
  
Johan van Galen was born in Essen. He fought in the Eighty Years' War against Spain, becoming a captain in 1630 and a regular captain in 1635, mostly fighting the Dunkirkers. In 1639, he fought in the Battle of the Downs under the command of Joris van Cats.
 
In 1645, as a Rear-Admiral, Van Galen was part of Vice-Admiral Witte de With's convoy breaking the blockade of The Sound by Denmark. Both men were very hot-tempered and proud; emotions ran so high that, at one point, in anger, Van Galen lowered his command flag and trampled it with his feet. De With put him in chains and delivered him to the capital of the adversary, Copenhagen. The embarrassed Danish court released Van Galen after an intervention by the French envoy.

A peculiarity of Van Galen is that he never served in the navy proper, an institution he disliked, but was employed by the Amsterdam Direction Chamber, a private organisation supporting the official navy. After the Republic had made peace with Spain in 1648, Van Galen was sent out three times, with Spanish assistance, to fight the corsairs of the Barbary Coast. In 1649, he was badly wounded when a gang of Spanish criminals intercepted him when he was returning in a sloop with prize money.

Van Galen retired late in 1650, but when the First Anglo-Dutch War between the Republic and the Commonwealth of England broke out, he was asked by the States-General, on 3 July 1652, to assume command of a Dutch fleet in the Mediterranean, as a Commodore and replacing Commandeur Joris van Cats. He departed on 24 July, reaching Livorno on 22 August. He was mortally wounded during the Battle of Leghorn, where his fleet destroyed part of the English Mediterranean Fleet. A cannonball smashed his right lower leg; it was amputated below-deck and afterwards, Van Galen continued to direct the battle. He died from wound fever ten days later in Livorno on 13 March 1653. Cornelis Tromp was then a young captain under his command.
 
Van Galen was given a state burial in the Nieuwe Kerk in Amsterdam and in 1656, a marble grave memorial was erected on which this poem is inscribed:

See also
Jan van Galenstraat metro station

Notes

References 
 G.G. Hellinga, 2006, Zeehelden uit de Gouden Eeuw.
 Warnsinck, JCM, Van Vlootvoogden en Zeeslagen, PN van Kampen & Zoon, 1940

1604 births
1653 deaths
Dutch naval personnel of the Anglo-Dutch Wars
17th-century Dutch military personnel
Admirals of the navy of the Dutch Republic
Military personnel from Essen
Burials at the Nieuwe Kerk, Amsterdam